Marcus Houston (born May 27, 1981) is a former American football player.

Early life and high school
Houston grew up in Denver, Colorado and attended Thomas Jefferson High School. As a senior, he rushed for 1723 yards and 28 touchdowns. Houston was one of the most sought after recruits in the nation and committed to play at the University of Colorado over offers from Texas, Florida State, Southern California, UCLA, Ohio State and Miami. He was widely considered to be the most highly-touted prospect in Colorado Buffaloes history at the time.

College career
Houston was named the Buffaloes' starting running back going into his freshman season. He rushed for 332 yards and one touchdown on 66 carries over three games before suffering an injury that ended his season. As a sophomore, Houston was part of a running back rotation with Brian Calhoun and Chris Brown and saw curtailed playing time. He frequently clashed with his running backs coach Eric Bieniemy, who often criticized Houston for what he believed to be a lack of toughness and unwillingness to play hurt. He suffered a torn groin muscle and rushed for 132 yards and one touchdown in seven games. In his junior year (2002), Houston played in only four of Colorado's games due to a partially torn ligament in his knee and rushed for 49 yards.

Houston ultimately transferred to Colorado State and was granted immediate eligibility to play. In his first year with the team he rushed 158 times for 636 yards, which was second on the team behind quarterback Bradlee Van Pelt, and nine touchdowns. Houston gained 206 yards on 57 carries in his final collegiate season.

References

External links
Colorado Buffaloes bio

1981 births
Living people
Players of American football from Denver
American football running backs
Colorado Buffaloes football players
Colorado State Rams football players